Meat Market 2 is a 2001 Canadian horror film directed and written by Brian Clement.  It stars Claire Westby, Alison Therriault, and Stephan Eng as zombie hunters who discover a safe haven run by an authoritarian cult leader.  It is the sequel to Clement's 2000 film Meat Market and is followed by Meat Market 3.

Plot 
Argenta, her vampire friend Nemesis, and a fellow survivor named Ferriden arrive at a safe haven run by Bill Wilhelm, who requires the people he shelters to surrender their freedom.  Wilhelm wants to recruit Argenta, but he does not care for her companions.  Nemesis is seemingly executed and Ferriden turned over to mad scientists in the compound.  When Nemesis returns for vengeance, zombies attack the inhabitants and kill Wilhelm.

Cast 
 Claire Westby as Argenta
 Alison Therriault as Nemesis
 Stephen Eng as Ferriden
 Terra Thomsen as Lt. Janet Habsburg
 Rob Nesbitt as Bill Wilhelm
 Chuck Depape as Dr. Gehlen
 Dave Krawchuck as Dr. Hubbard
 Dustan Roberts as The Chef

Release 
Sub Rosa Studios released the film in a bundle with Meat Market, the first film, in January 2007.

Reception 
Mike Bracken of IGN called the film watchable, especially considering its budget, but he criticized the weak social commentary and slow pacing.  Beyond Hollywood wrote that the film panders too much to fans of gore films while ignoring the story.  Commenting on the number of zombies and excessive gore, Peter Dendle wrote in The Zombie Movie Encyclopedia that the franchise "traffics in quantity over quality."

References

External links 
 

2001 films
2001 horror films
Canadian independent films
English-language Canadian films
Canadian zombie films
Camcorder films
Films directed by Brian Clement
Films about cults
2000s English-language films
2000s Canadian films